Brian Bennett (born 15 June 1938) is a former  Australian rules footballer who played with South Melbourne in the Victorian Football League (VFL).

Notes

External links 

Living people
1938 births
Australian rules footballers from Melbourne
Sydney Swans players